CDC45 is a protein that in humans is encoded by the CDC45L gene.

Function 

The protein encoded by this gene was identified by its strong similarity with Saccharomyces cerevisiae Cdc45, an essential protein required to the initiation of DNA replication. Cdc45 is a member of the highly conserved multiprotein complex including Cdc6/Cdc18, the minichromosome maintenance proteins (MCMs) and DNA polymerase, which is important for early steps of DNA replication in eukaryotes. This protein has been shown to interact with MCM7 and DNA polymerase alpha. Studies of the similar gene in Xenopus suggested that this protein plays a pivotal role in the loading of DNA polymerase alpha onto chromatin. Multiple polyadenylation sites of this gene are reported.

Interactions 

CDC45-related protein has been shown to interact with:
 MCM3, 
 MCM6, 
 MCM7, 
 ORC1L,  and
 ORC6L.

References

Further reading

External links